The 2003 St Helens Metropolitan Borough Council election took place on 1 May 2003 to elect members of St Helens Metropolitan Borough Council in Merseyside, England. One third of the council was up for election and the Labour Party stayed in overall control of the council.

After the election, the composition of the council was:
Labour 33
Liberal Democrats 15
Conservative 6

Background
Four councillors stood down at the election, Michael Blaney, Patricia Martinez-Williams, John Mealor and Bill Noctor, from Marshalls Cross, Windle, Haydock and West Sutton wards respectively. In Marshalls Cross two seats were contested in 2003, after the death of councillor Valerie Beirne in 2002.

Both the Labour and Liberal Democrat parties contested all 19 seats that were up for election, while the Conservatives had 18 candidates and there was 1 Socialist Alliance and 1 independent candidate. The Conservatives targeted gaining a seat in Windle, where the party had taken a seat from Labour for the last two election, while the Liberal Democrats aimed to make progress in Grange Park and Haydock wards.

For the 2003 election St Helens had a trial of all postal voting across the whole council in an attempt to double the 26% turnout at the last election in 2002. By the 29 April 2003 turnout had reached an average of 42% across the council, with the final turnout being 48% and with a high of 57% in Eccleston.

Election result
Labour retained control of the council with 33 councillors after gaining one seat from Socialist Labour, but losing one to the Conservatives. The Labour gain came in Grange Park ward, while the Conservatives took an extra seat in Windle. This meant the Liberal Democrats remained on 15 seats, while the Conservative gain took them to 6 councillors.

Ward results

References

2003 English local elections
2003
2000s in Merseyside